Taska Film sometimes credited as Taska Productions (owned by Kristian Taska) is an Estonian film production company responsible for producing the number 1 Estonian box office hit during the last decade: Names in Marble.

Candles in the Dark directed by Maximilian Schell was filmed in Estonia (produced by Ilmar Taska) in association with The Kushner-Locke Company. The movie was possibly the first movie ever screened in the US that was shot in Estonia.

Ilmar Taska is an Estonian filmmaker has been the writer and producer for 20th Century Fox movie Back in the USSR (1992).

Ilmar's son Kristian Taska born on 23 November 1973 has been the producer of Estonian feature films like Names in Marble (2002), Set Point (2004) directed by Ilmar Taska, Röövlirahnu Martin (2005) directed by René Vilbre.

In 2022 they produced Melchior the Apothecary.

References 

Film production companies of Estonia
Mass media in Tallinn